Kingston Western is a parliamentary constituency represented in the House of Representatives of the Jamaican Parliament. It elects one Member of Parliament MP by the first past the post system of election. The constituency was one of the original 32 Parliamentary seats. West Kingston is dominated by the Jamaica Labour Party (JLP) which has held the seat continuously since 1955. JLP Prime Ministers Alexander Bustamante, Hugh Shearer, Edward Seaga and Bruce Golding all represented the seat at one time or another, although Bustamante and Shearer did not represent the constituency during their premierships.

Boundaries 
The constituency covers the Tivoli Gardens and Denham Town areas of Kingston.

Members of Parliament

Elections

References

Parliamentary constituencies of Jamaica